John Chester (August 17, 1785 – January 12, 1829) was the second president of Rensselaer Polytechnic Institute. He was born in Wethersfield, Connecticut in August 1785. He was the son of John and Elizabeth Chester. He graduated from Yale College in 1804. He studied theology under Dr. Joseph Lyman of Hatfield, Massachusetts and received a license to preach in 1807 from the Hartford Association College. He first preached in several towns in Massachusetts and Connecticut and then moved to New York State, where he first preached in Cooperstown, New York and between 1810 and 1815 in Hudson, New York. Chester was elected a member of the American Antiquarian Societyin 1814. In 1815, he moved to Albany, New York where he was pastor of the Second Presbyterian Church. He was a founder and an early president of the Albany Female Academy, which became the Albany Academy for Girls and was also a trustee of The Albany Academy. He received the degree of Doctor of Divinity in 1821 from Union College. He was appointed president of Rensselaer on June 25, 1828. He died in Philadelphia on January 12, 1829.

Archival collections
The Presbyterian Historical Society in Philadelphia, Pennsylvania, has  papers related to John Chester in its holdings. The papers include an 1821 letter to J. Romeyn Beck and a letter of introduction for Erastus Colton.

References

1785 births
1829 deaths
People from Wethersfield, Connecticut
Presbyterian Church in the United States of America ministers
Presidents of Rensselaer Polytechnic Institute
Yale College alumni
Members of the American Antiquarian Society